Ophthalmic Surgery, Lasers and Imaging Retina is a monthly peer-reviewed medical journal of ophthalmology covering retinal diseases, surgery, and pharmacotherapy. It was established in 1970 and is published by SLACK Incorporated.

History
The journal was established as a quarterly journal in 1970 with George W. Weinstein serving as founding editor-in-chief. The current editor-in-chief is Darius M. Moshfeghi (Stanford University School of Medicine).

Since 2016, the journal has published one issue per month.

Abstracting and indexing
The journal is abstracted and indexed in:

According to the Journal Citation Reports, the journal has a 2021 impact factor of 1.296.

References

External links

Monthly journals
English-language journals
Ophthalmology journals
Surgery journals
Publications established in 1976